Percuil is a hamlet in Roseland, Cornwall, England. Percuil (or Porthcuel) is on the east bank of the Percuil River and south-west of Gerrans.

References

Hamlets in Cornwall